Achatella is a genus of trilobite in the order Phacopida, which existed in what is now Ontario, Canada. It was named by Delo in 1935, and the type species is Achatella achates, which was originally assigned to the genus Dalmanites by Billings in 1860. Achatella also contains the species Achatella billingsi, and Achatella truncatocaudata.

References

External links
 Achatella at the Paleobiology Database

Fossils of Canada
Fossil taxa described in 1935
Paleontology in Ontario
Paleozoic life of Ontario
Paleozoic life of Quebec
Pterygometopidae
Phacopida genera